Mithuben Hormusji Petit (11 April 1892 – 16 July 1973) was one of the pioneer Indian independence female activists who participated in Mahatma Gandhi's Dandi March.

Biography
Born on 11 April 1892 into an affluent Parsi Zoroastrian family in Bombay (now Mumbai), Mithuben Petit's father was Sir Dinshaw Maneckji Petit, a well-known industrialist, philanthropist, and Baronet. Her activism was met with challenges by the Petit family, who urged her to renounce her activism or risk disinheritance, to which she refused and responded: "It is your business to sit with the government and mine to remain with the nation.".

Indian independence movement 
The young Petit Baroness was influenced by her aunt, Jaiji Jehangir Petit, who was a follower of Mahatma Gandhi and was the Secretary of the Rashtriya Stree Sabha, a women's movement founded on Gandhian ideals. Petit, along with Kasturba Gandhi and Sarojini Naidu, played a major part in the Salt March, with Kasturba Gandhi beginning the march at Sabarmati, Sarojini Naidu lifting the salt for the first time at Dandi on 6 April 1930 and Petit standing behind Mahatma Gandhi when he repeated the violation at Bhimrad on 9 April 1930. The march was one of the most important event in the Indian independence movement. In a time when women were forced to take a back seat (due to the patriarchal culture at that time in India) Petit was one of the three women who played a pivotal role in the march and the civil disobedience against tax on salt. Petit participated in the Bardoli Satyagraha of 1928 which was a no-tax campaign against the British Raj where she worked under the guidance of Sardar Patel. Petit was instrumental in the anti-liquor movement in India and spent time with Mahatma Gandhi and explained the liquor issue with the schedule tribes in Gujarat.

Social work
Petit set up an ashram in Maroli called Kasturba Vanat Shala or Kasturba Sevashram in 1930, which taught underprivileged children from families of Adivasis, Harijans and fisher folk spinning, carding, weaving, dairy farming, leather-work and a Diploma Course in Sewing, to make the women self-sufficient. Petit, known as "Maiji" (mother) also opened a hospital of the same name for the scientific treatment of mentally ill patients in 1942.

She died on 16 July 1973.

Recognition
Petit received the Padma Shri in 1961 for her social work.

References

External links
Kasturba Sevashram

Women Indian independence activists
1892 births
1973 deaths
Recipients of the Padma Shri in social work
Parsi people from Mumbai
Gandhians
Social workers from Maharashtra
Women educators from Maharashtra
Educators from Maharashtra
Indian independence activists from Maharashtra
20th-century Indian educational theorists
Social workers
Women in Maharashtra politics
20th-century Indian women politicians
20th-century Indian politicians
Daughters of baronets
20th-century women educators